James Loomis Madden (1892 – 1972) was acting chancellor of New York University from 1951 to 1952.

External links
Chancellors and Presidents of New York University

1892 births
1972 deaths
Presidents of New York University
20th-century American academics